Obite Evan Ndicka (born 20 August 1999) is a French professional footballer who plays as a centre-back for Bundesliga club Eintracht Frankfurt.

Ndicka is an academy graduate of Auxerre and made his senior debut for the club in January 2017, aged 17. He spent the next season-and-half at the club, making 14 senior appearances before joining Bundesliga side Eintracht in July 2018.

Early life
Ndicka was born in Paris.

Club career

Auxerre
Having joined Ligue 2 side Auxerre at the age of 13, Ndicka progressed through the club's academy and made his professional debut on 27 January 2017, starting in a 1–0 win over Clermont. He signed his first professional contract with the club on 5 February. He ultimately made 14 appearances for the club over the next season and half before signing for Bundesliga side Eintracht Frankfurt for a reported fee of €5.5m.

Eintracht Frankfurt
On 5 July 2018, Ndicka signed for Eintracht on a five-year deal. He quickly became an important member of the first-team squad and featured regularly for the club in the league and the Europa League. In February 2019, his performances earned him the Bundesliga Rookie of the Month award, a monthly title awarded to the highest performing under-23 player in a particular month, and saw him also nominated for the Rookie of the Season award. From then, he missed only one match for the remainder of the season as the club narrowly missed out on Champions League qualification.

International career
Ndicka was born in France and is of Cameroonian descent. He represented France at U16 and U17 level and was called up to the U18 team for the first time by manager Bernard Diomède in March 2017.

Career statistics

Honours
Eintracht Frankfurt
UEFA Europa League: 2021–22

Individual
Bundesliga Team of the Season: 2021–22

References

External links

 
 

1999 births
Living people
Footballers from Paris
French footballers
France youth international footballers
France under-21 international footballers
Association football defenders
AJ Auxerre players
Eintracht Frankfurt players
UEFA Europa League winning players
Ligue 2 players
Bundesliga players
French expatriate footballers
Expatriate footballers in Germany
French expatriate sportspeople in Germany
Black French sportspeople
French sportspeople of Cameroonian descent